2K7 may refer to:

 the year 2007
 College Hoops 2K7, 2006 video game
 Dan the Automator Presents 2K7, NBA 2K7 soundtrack album
 Major League Baseball 2K7, 2007 video game
 NBA 2K7, 2006 video game
 NHL 2K7, 2006 video game